In Love is the third studio album by German band Juli. It was released on 17 September 2010 by Polydor and Island Records.

Track listing

Charts

Weekly charts

Year-end charts

Release history

References

External links
 Juli.tv – official site

2010 albums
Juli (band) albums
German-language albums